ADAM19 (A Disintegrin And Metalloproteinase 19, MADDAM, meltrin beta), is a human gene.

Function 

This gene encodes a member of the ADAM (a disintegrin and metalloprotease domain) family. Members of this family are membrane-anchored proteins structurally related to snake venom disintegrins, and have been implicated in a variety of biological processes involving cell-cell and cell-matrix interactions, including fertilization, muscle development, and neurogenesis. This member is a type I transmembrane protein and serves as a marker for dendritic cell differentiation. It has also been demonstrated to be an active metalloproteinase, which may be involved in normal physiological and pathological processes such as cells migration, cell adhesion, cell-cell and cell-matrix interactions, and signal transduction. Alternative splicing results in two transcript variants.

Interactions 

ADAM19 has been shown to interact with ABI2.

References

External links

Further reading 

 
 
 
 
 
 
 
 
 
 
 
 
 
 
 
 
 

Proteases
Human proteins
EC 3.4.24